OSA Seattle FC, formerly FC Tacoma 253, is an American association football (soccer) club based in the Seattle metro area. The team plays within the Northwest Conference of the National Premier Soccer League, a national league generally considered the fourth-tier of the American Soccer Pyramid.

It is affiliated with a women's team, OSA XF (formerly AC Seattle), which competes in the semi-professional Women's Premier Soccer League. Both are run by OSA Soccer Academy, LLC.

History

League
FC Tacoma 253 was announced as an National Premier Soccer League expansion team in November 2014, with plans to begin play the following season. Tacoma tied Real San Jose, 1-1, at home in its first-ever league match on March 28, 2015. Abdi Galgalo scored the team's first league goal.

The club's first notable signing was of Oussama Essabr, a Moroccan product of the Juventus F.C. Youth Sector. Shortly thereafter, the club acquired Samuele Piccinotti from Serie D A.S. Varese 1910's academy along with Marco Dugo, Gianmarco Peressini, and Stefano Layeni.

The team finished its inaugural season as champions of the Northwest Conference, which secured qualification for the 2015 NPSL West Region playoffs. However, the team lost to Sacramento Gold FC, 3–2, in extra time in its first match.

During the offseason, following meetings between head coach Filippo Milano and owner Giuseppe Pezzano, the team re-branded to OSA FC with plans to integrate more Italian talent alongside young American players. The newly branded team finished the 2016 NPSL season first in the Northwest Conference for a second straight year, defeating Portland Spartans FC, 2–1, on July 2. OSA earned the organizations first playoff win the West Region first round when it beat CD Aguiluchos USA, 3–2, on the road. The team fell to West Region top seed Albion SC Pros in the region semifinal.

Prior to the 2020 NPSL season, the team changed its name to OSA Seattle FC.

U.S. Open Cup
Prior to the 2015 regular season's start Tacoma played its inaugural match on February 20, 2015 in a qualifier for the 2015 Lamar Hunt U.S. Open Cup, in which they defeated fellow Northwest Conference team and Oregon-based Spartans Futbol Club, 2–1, at Starfire Sports. On March 22, 2015, In its second match, FC Tacoma beat Southwest Conference representative San Diego Flash, 6–1, at Memorial Stadium (Seattle), and officially qualified for the 2015 U.S. Open Cup.

Tacoma faced the Kitsap Pumas in the first round of the tournament on May 13, 2015, and lost, 5–2. Steven Wright scored the team's first ever goal in the tournament, while Pedro Milan picked up the second.

The team, now playing under the OSA name, qualified for a second time via an at-large bid based on its 2016 NPSL results. In the 2017 U.S. Open Cup First round, OSA won its first ever tournament game when it defeated Seattle Sounders FC U-23 in a penalty kick shootout, 0-0 (5-3), on May 10, 2017. A week later in the second round, the team played to a second straight penalty kick shootout against United Soccer League side Reno 1868 FC where it lost, 1-1 (3-4).

Stadiums

Logo history

Year-by-year

Honors
National Premier Soccer League
 Northwest Conference Champions (2): 2015, 2016

References

External links
 

Association football clubs established in 2008
National Premier Soccer League teams
Soccer clubs in Seattle
Soccer clubs in Washington (state)
2008 establishments in Washington (state)